Puthalapattu is a Mandalam in Chittoor district of the Indian state of Andhra Pradesh. It is the mandal headquarters of Puthalapattu mandal. Puthalapattuis suburban of Chittoor city.

Demographics 

As per Population Census 2011 the Puthalapattu village has population of 5583 of which 2787 are males while 2796 are females, population of children is 541. Sex Ratio of the village is 1003 which is higher than Andhra Pradesh state average of 993, child Sex Ratio of the Puthalapattu is 859. literacy rate of Puthalapattu village was 77.33% compared to 67.02% of Andhra Pradesh.

Public Representatives 
MS Babu - Member of Andhra Pradesh Legislative Council, Puthalapattu (belongs to YSR Congress Party)

Educational Institutions 
There are multiple educational institutions in Puthalapattu as per Board of Intermediate Education, Andhra Pradesh.

 Government Junior College
 Zilla Parishad High School
 Bheemeshwar Junior College
 Bheemeshwar Degree College
 Margadarsi English Medium School
 Nava Bharath English Medium School

Transport 

APSRTC runs bus services from Chittoor and Tirupati to this village. NH 140 connects the village with Tirupati road. South Indian Railway runs train services from Chittoor and Tirupathi through this village.

References 

Villages in Chittoor district
Mandal headquarters in Chittoor district